The Oosterparkbuurt is a neighbourhood of Amsterdam, Netherlands. The neighbourhood derives its name from the Oosterpark. Three of its main streets (the Eerste Oosterparkstraat, Tweede Oosterparkstraat and Derde Oosterparkstraat) were also named after the park. The neighbourhood was built late in the 19th century. Until World War II, it was home to many working-class Jews. During urban renewal operations of the 1970s and 1980s, many of the original 19th-century housing was demolished and replaced. 

Amsterdam-Oost
Jews and Judaism in Amsterdam
Neighbourhoods of Amsterdam
Working class in Europe
Social class in the Netherlands